The 1987 Greece bus attacks refer to two separate attacks committed by the 17 November Group on buses carrying American military personnel near Athens, Greece.

The first attack, on April 24, 1987, wounded 16 Americans (four of which were civilians) and two Greeks (the bus driver and a civilian car driver nearby). A Hellenic Air Force bus was transporting American servicemen from a Greek base to the American-operated Hellenikon Air Base when a remote-controlled car bomb exploded, causing the bus to lose control and hit a tree. It was initially reported the bus was hit by a rocket attack. The chief of Greece's police called it a "well-planned crime". Greek Prime Minister Andreas Papandreou condemned the attack.

The second attack happened on August 10, 1987, and injured 11 Americans (one a female civilian) and the Greek bus driver. The attack happened near Voula beach to the south of Athens and was again caused by a remote-controlled car bomb on the road the bus was travelling on.

The far-left 17 November Group had previously launched attacks against American targets in Greece.

See also
1985 Athens bar bombing

References

1987 in Greece
1987 in military history
Explosions in 1987
April 1987 events in Europe
August 1987 events in Europe
1987 crimes in Greece
Terrorist incidents in Europe in 1987
1980s in Athens
Terrorism in Greece
Bus bombings in Europe